Suryakant Tripathi "Nirala" (21 February 1897 – 15 October 1961) was an Indian poet, novelist, essayist and story-writer who wrote in Hindi. He was also an artist, who drew many contemporary sketches.

Biography  
Tripathi was born on 21 February 1897 in Medinipur in Bengal. Nirala's father, Pandit Ramsahaya Tripathi, was a government servant and was a tyrannical person. His mother died when he was very young. Nirala was educated in the Bengali medium at Mahishadal Raj High School at Mahishadal, Purba Medinipur. Subsequently, he shifted to Lucknow and thence to village Gadhakola of Unnao district, to which his father originally belonged. Growing up, he gained inspiration from personalities like Ramakrishna Paramhansa, Swami Vivekananda, and Rabindranath Tagore.

After his marriage at the age of 20, Nirala learned Hindi at the insistence of his wife, Manohara Devi. Soon, he started writing poems in Hindi, instead of Bengali. After a bad childhood, Nirala had a few good years with his wife. But this phase was short-lived as his wife died when he was 22, and later his daughter (who was a widow) also expired. Nirala lost half of his family, including his wife and daughter, in the 1918 Spanish flu influenza outbreak.

Most of his life was somewhat in the bohemian tradition. He wrote strongly against social injustice and exploitation in society. Since he was more or less a rebel, both in form and content, acceptance did not come easily. What he got in plenty was ridicule and derision. All this may have played a role in making him a victim of schizophrenia in his later life and he was admitted to Central Institute of Psychiatry, Ranchi.

Work 
Many of Nirala's poems were translated by David Rubin, and are available in the collections, A Season on the Earth: Selected Poems of Nirala (Columbia University Press, 1977), The Return of Sarasvati: Four Hindi Poets (Oxford University Press, 1993), and Of Love and War: A Chayavad Anthology (Oxford University Press, 2005). Nirala : Aatmhanta Astha was a critical analysis of his works written by Doodhnath Singh.

Legacy 
Today, a park, Nirala Uddyan, an auditorium, Nirala Prekshagrah, and a degree college, Mahapran Nirala Degree College, in the Unnao District are named after him.

In popular culture 
The Films Division of India produced a short documentary film on his life, titled Suryakant Tripathi Nirala, directed by Rajiv Kumar. It covers his works and achievements.

Reception 
Eugenia Vanina notes ‘Mahārāj Śivājī kā patr Mirzā Rājā Jai Siṅgh ke nām’ to endear its audience into Hindu Nationalism.

Works

Poetry

 Ram Ki Shakti Puja (राम की शक्ति पूजा)
 Dhwani (ध्वनि)
 Apara (अपरा)
 Saroj Smriti (सरोज स्मृति)
 Parimal (परिमल)
 Priyatam (प्रियतम)
 Anaamika (अनामिका, 1938)
 Geetika (गीतिका) 
 Kukurmutta (कुकुरमुत्ता, 1941)
 Adima (अणिमा)
 Bela (बेला)
 Naye Patte (नये पत्ते)
 Archana (अर्चना)
 Geet Gunj (गीतगुंज)
 Aradhana (आराधना)
 Tulsidas (तुलसीदास, 1938)
 Janmabhumi (जन्मभूमि)
 Jago Phir Ek Bar (जागो फिर एक बार)
 Bhikshuk (भिक्षुक)
 Todti Patthar (तोड़ती पत्थर)

Novels
 Apsara (अप्सरा)
 Alka (अलका)
 Prabhavati (प्रभावती)
 Nirupama (निरुपमा)
 Chameli (चमेली)
 Choti ki Pakad (चोटी की पकड़)
 Indulekha (इन्दुलेखा)
 Kale Karname (काले कारनामे)

Collections of stories
 Chhaturi Chamar (चतुरी चमार)
 Sukul ki Biwi (सुकुल की बीवी, 1941)
 Sakhi (साखी)
 Lily (लिली)
 Devi (देवी)

Essay-collections
 Prabandha-Parichaya (प्रबंध परिचय)
 Bangbhasha ka Uchcharan (बंगभाषा का उच्चारण)
 Ravindra-Kavita-Kannan (रवीन्द्र-कविता-कानन)
 Prabandh-Padya (प्रबंध पद्य)
 Prabandh-Pratima (प्रबंध प्रतिमा)
 Chabuk (चाबुक)
 Chayan (चयन)
 Sangraha (संग्रह)

Prose
 Kullibhat (कुल्लीभाट)
 Billesur Bakriha (बिल्लेसुर बकरिहा)

Translations

 Anand Math (आनन्दमठ)
 Vish-Vriksh (विष वृक्ष)
 Krishnakant ka Vil (कृष्णकांत का विल)
 Kapal Kundala (कपाल कुण्डला)
 Durgesh Nandini (दुर्गेश नन्दिनी)
 Raj Singh (राज सिंह)
 Raj Rani (राज रानी)
 Devi Chaudharani (देवी चौधरानी)
 Yuglanguliya (युगलांगुलीय)
 Chandrasekhar (चन्द्रशेखर)
 Rajni (रजनी)
 Sri Ramkrishna Vachnamrit (श्री रामकृष्ण वचनामृत)
 Bharat mein Vivekanand (भारत में विवेकानंद)
 Rajyog (राजयोग)

References

External links
Nirala at Kavita Kosh – A large collection of Hindi Poetry

1897 births
1961 deaths
Hindi-language writers
Hindi-language poets
People from Paschim Medinipur district
People from Unnao
People from Allahabad
Poets from Uttar Pradesh
Poets from West Bengal
Writers from West Bengal
Writers from Allahabad
20th-century Indian poets
20th-century Indian male writers
Indian male poets